Pounawea is a small town in The Catlins, an area of the southern South Island of New Zealand. It is located four kilometres southwest of Owaka, at the mouth of the Catlins River. It is a popular holiday spot with a seasonal population, there are numerous cribs (holiday homes) at the settlement.

Demographics
Pounawea is described by Statistics New Zealand as a rural settlement.

Pounawea had a population of 51 at the 2018 New Zealand census, a decrease of 12 people (−19.0%) since the 2013 census, and a decrease of 3 people (−5.6%) since the 2006 census. There were 24 households. There were 24 males and 30 females, giving a sex ratio of 0.8 males per female. The median age was 55.2 years (compared with 37.4 years nationally), with 6 people (11.8%) aged under 15 years, 3 (5.9%) aged 15 to 29, 30 (58.8%) aged 30 to 64, and 15 (29.4%) aged 65 or older.

Ethnicities were 94.1% European/Pākehā, 5.9% Māori, 5.9% Pacific peoples, 5.9% Asian, and 5.9% other ethnicities (totals add to more than 100% since people could identify with multiple ethnicities).

Although some people objected to giving their religion, 58.8% had no religion, 41.2% were Christian and 5.9% were Buddhist.

Of those at least 15 years old, 3 (6.7%) people had a bachelor or higher degree, and 9 (20.0%) people had no formal qualifications. The median income was $26,300, compared with $31,800 nationally. The employment status of those at least 15 was that 24 (53.3%) people were employed full-time and 6 (13.3%) were part-time.

References

Populated places in Otago
The Catlins
Clutha District